Kendell Williams (born June 14, 1995) is an American track and field athlete competing in the combined events. She represented her country at the 2016 World Indoor Championships finishing sixth. Williams qualified to represent the United States at the 2020 Summer Olympics. She won the bronze medal at the 2022 World Indoor Championships in Belgrade.

Williams' brother is fellow American track and field athlete Devon Williams.

NCAA
Kendell Williams ends her senior year (2017) as a seven time NCAA Division I Champion. U.S. Track & Field and Cross Country Coaches Association All-American. Kendell won the heptathlon at 2016 NCAA Division I Outdoor Track and Field Championships, she scored 6225 points.  Kendall won the pentathlon at 2016 NCAA Division I Indoor Track and Field Championships, she scored 4703 points and 2014 NCAA Division I Indoor Track and Field Championships scoring 4635 points. Kendell won the pentathlon at 2015 and 2016 SEC Indoor Championships and 2014 heptathlon at SEC Outdoor Championships.
Kendell leaves the NCAA as the only Athlete to win the same event 4 years in a row. (The Indoor Pentathlon) Kendell still holds the National record (4703 pts)
Kendell won the NCAA Div 1 Heptathlon 3 times.

While at Georgia, she won the Honda Sports Award as the nation's best female track and field competitor in 2017.

Competition record

Personal bests
Outdoor
200 meters – 23.50 (+0.2 m/s, Sacramento 2017)
800 meters – 2:15.31 (Eugene 2016)
100 meters hurdles – 12.58 (+0.4 m/s, Doha 2019)
High jump – 1.85 (Albuquerque 2012)
Long jump – 6.71 (+1.1 m/s Des Moines 2019)
Shot put – 13.41 (Des Moines 2019)
Javelin Throw – 46.48 (Eugene 2017)
Heptathlon – 6610 (Des Moines 2019)
Indoor
800 meters – 2:15.61 (College Station 2017)
60 meters hurdles – 8.03 (College Station 2017)
High jump – 1.88 (Albuquerque 2014)
Long jump – 6.54 (Blacksburg 2015)
Shot put – 13.55 (Birmingham 2016)
Pentathlon – 4703 (Birmingham 2016)

References

Living people
1995 births
American heptathletes
American female hurdlers
African-American female track and field athletes
Sportspeople from Marietta, Georgia
Athletes (track and field) at the 2016 Summer Olympics
Georgia Lady Bulldogs track and field athletes
Olympic track and field athletes of the United States
Track and field athletes from Georgia (U.S. state)
USA Outdoor Track and Field Championships winners
USA Indoor Track and Field Championships winners
Athletes (track and field) at the 2020 Summer Olympics
World Athletics Indoor Championships medalists
21st-century African-American sportspeople
21st-century African-American women